Farningham Wood is a  biological Site of Special Scientific Interest east of Swanley in Kent. It is also a Local Nature Reserve. It is owned and managed by Sevenoaks District Council and Farningham Parish Council.

This wood has a variety of soil conditions, resulting in diverse ground flora and invertebrates, some of which are typical ancient woodland. Ponds in the middle support several species of amphibian, and the nationally rare hoverfly Volucella inanis has been recorded on the site.

There is access from Calfstock Lane.

References

Local Nature Reserves in Kent
Sites of Special Scientific Interest in Kent
Forests and woodlands of Kent